Chang Tae-il (born April 10, 1965 in South Korea ) is a retired South Korean boxer.

Professional career

After turning professional in 1981 he had compiled a record of 21-2-1 in 6 years before challenging for the vacant IBF super flyweight championship against Kwon Soon-chun in 1987. The title had been declared vacant after titleholder Ellyas Pical challenged and lost to WBA champion Khaosai Galaxy. Chang was successful in his fight against Kwon and won the IBF title. He lost the title in his first defense to the original titleholder Pical and would retire from the sport in 1989 after losing to WBA champion Khaosai Galaxy.

See also 
List of super-flyweight boxing champions

External links

1965 births
Living people
South Korean male boxers
Super-flyweight boxers
World super-flyweight boxing champions
International Boxing Federation champions